Raimund Hermann Siegfried Moltke (usually known as Siegfried Moltke) (born Leipzig 9 July 1869; died ca. 1958) was a German writer and economist.  He studied at Leipzig and at the Art Academy in Berlin and later became librarian of the Chamber of Commerce of Leipzig.

Selected works
 Verse (1895)
 Aus Meiner Skizzenmappe (1897)
 Der Heilige Karl, a play (1903)
 Die Feder Geschärft (1914)
 Gott im Leide (1915)
 Kreuzwege des Lebens (1916)
 Um die Mark Main (1919) 
 Leipzigs Handelskorporationem (1907)
 Zwei Kapitel aus Leipzigs Handelsund Verkehrsgeschichte (1912)
 Friedrich List (1913)
 Katalog Altkaufmännischer Archive in Leipzig (1913)
 Die Deutsche Eisenbahn im Kriege (1916)
 Die Leipziger Messe im Kriege (1917)
  
He wrote the biography Bernhard von Tauchnitz (1916).

References

1869 births
Year of death missing
German librarians
German biographers
Male biographers
German male non-fiction writers